LOVE Television is a local cable-only television station broadcasting 24 hours a day from Belize City, Belize. It is a subsidiary of RSV Limited, and has been on since the late 1990s.

Manager of Love Television is Ms. Julia Carrillo

Personalities of LOVE Television 

Rene Villanueva Sr. - Chief Executive Officer 
Rene Villanueva Jr. - General Manager 
Julia Carrillo  - Executive Coordinator 
Ava Diaz - Director of News &  Current Affairs 
 Sharmane Garbutt Garcia - Producer 
Matthew Villanueva - Videographer
Olynn Kingston -Videographer 
 Marion Ali - Reporter
 Natalie Novelo - Reporter
 Hipolito Novelo - Reporter
 Paul Mahung - Punta Gorda correspondent
 Harry Arzu - Dangriga correspondent
 Elaine Berry - San Ignacio and Western Cayo correspondent
 Eufemio "Fem" Cruz - Belmopan and Eastern Cayo correspondent

Television stations in Belize
RSV Media Center
Television channels and stations established in 1993